Choreutis taprobanes is a moth in the family Choreutidae. It was described by Philipp Christoph Zeller in 1877. It is found on Sri Lanka.

References

Choreutis
Moths described in 1877